Mutawintji is a small settlement in north-west New South Wales, Australia, about  northeast of Broken Hill. At the time of the 2021 census, Mutawintji had a population of 30 people.

Mutawintji is the Aboriginal word for "grass", reflecting the area's nature.

Climate
Summer temperatures can reach  in Mutawintji.

Tourism
Mutawintji is the location of Mutawintji National Park.

Demographics
The median age of persons in Mutawintji was 44 years. There were less males than females, with 44.8% of the population male and 55.2% female. The average household size was 3.8 people per household.

Notes and references

Towns in New South Wales
Unincorporated Far West Region